Svetlana Bogdanova may refer to:

Svetlana Bogdanova (handballer) (born 1964), Russian handball player
Svetlana Bogdanova (water polo) (born 1976), Russian water polo player